Boruszyn  is a village in the administrative district of Gmina Lipinki Łużyckie, within Żary County, Lubusz Voivodeship, in western Poland.

The village has a population of 220.

References

Boruszyn